These are lists of incumbents (individuals holding offices or positions), including heads of states or of subnational entities.

A historical discipline, archontology, focuses on the study of past and current office holders.

Incumbents may also be found in the countries' articles (main article and "Politics of") and the list of national leaders, recent changes in 2020 in politics and government, and past leaders on State leaders by year and Colonial governors by year.

Various articles group lists by title, function or topic: e.g. abdication, assassinated persons, cabinet (government), chancellor, ex-monarchs (20th century), head of government, head of state, lieutenant governor, mayor, military commanders, minister (and ministers by portfolio below), order of precedence, peerage, president, prime minister, Reichstag participants (1792), secretary of state.

Heads of international organizations

President of the European Council
President of the European Commission
United Nations Secretary-General
United Nations High Commissioner for Refugees
International Monetary Fund Managing Directors
Director-General of the World Trade Organization
NATO Secretaries General
FIFA presidents
International Olympic Committee Presidents

Heads of state or government

Africa

Eastern Africa
Burundi: Rulers of Burundi
Comoros:
Rulers of Comoros
Sultans on the Comoros
Kenya: Rulers of Kenya
Madagascar: Rulers of Madagascar
Monarchs of Madagascar (until 1897)
Colonial Heads of Madagascar
List of presidents of Madagascar
Malawi (former Nyasaland, former British Central Africa Protectorate)
Heads of state of Malawi
Heads of government of Malawi
Colonial heads of Malawi (Nyasaland)
Rulers of Malawi
Rulers of Nkamanga
Rulers of the Ngoni Dynasty of Jere (Qeko)
Rulers of the Ngoni Dynasty of Maseko (Gomani)
Mauritius
Queen of Mauritius
Presidents of Mauritius
Governors-General of Mauritius
Prime Ministers of Mauritius
Mozambique
Heads of state of Mozambique
Heads of government of Mozambique
Heads of National Resistance Government of Mozambique
Colonial heads of Mozambique
Colonial heads of Delagoa Bay
Rwanda
Kings of Rwanda
Presidents of Rwanda
Prime Ministers of Rwanda
Seychelles
Presidents of Seychelles
Tanzania
Presidents of Tanzania
Prime Ministers of Tanzania
Presidents of Zanzibar
Prime Ministers of Zanzibar
Governors-General of Tanganyika
Presidents of Tanganyika
Sultans of Zanzibar
Uganda
Governors-General of Uganda
Presidents of Uganda
Prime Ministers of Uganda
Kings of Nkole
Kings of Buganda
Zambia
Presidents of Zambia
Zimbabwe
Munhumutapa emperors
Prime Ministers of the Federation of Rhodesia and Nyasaland
Prime Ministers of Rhodesia
Presidents of Rhodesia
Presidents of Zimbabwe

Horn of Africa
Djibouti: Rulers of Djibouti
Eritrea: Rulers of Eritrea
Ethiopia: Rulers of Ethiopia
Somalia: Presidents of Somalia
Somaliland: Presidents of Somaliland

Middle Africa
Angola
Heads of state of Angola (see also: Presidents of Angola 
Heads of government of Angola (see also: Prime Minister of Angola 
List of current Angolan ministers
Colonial heads of Angola
Heads of state of the Democratic People's Republic of Angola
Heads of government of the Democratic People's Republic of Angola
Heads of state of Cabinda
Heads of government of Cabinda
Colonial and provincial heads of Cabinda
Cameroon
Heads of state of Cameroon
Heads of government of Cameroon
Colonial heads of British Cameroon (Cameroons)
Heads of government of British Cameroon (Cameroons)
Colonial heads of French Cameroon (Cameroun)
Heads of government of French Cameroon (Cameroun)
Colonial heads of German Cameroon (Kamerun)
Colonial heads of Ambas Bay (Victoria Colony)
Rulers of Bamoun (Mum)
Rulers of Mandara
Central African Republic
Heads of state of the Central African Republic (and Central African Empire)
Heads of government of the Central African Republic (and Central African Empire)
Colonial heads of Central Africa (Oubangui-Chari)
Chad
Heads of state of Chad
Heads of government of Chad
Colonial heads of Chad
Rulers of Baguirmi
Rulers of Wada’i
Kanem-Bornu emperors
Congo, Democratic Republic of the (Zaire/'Congo-Kinshasa')
Heads of state of the Democratic Republic of the Congo
Heads of government of the Democratic Republic of the Congo
Heads of state of the Congo Free State
Colonial heads of Congo
Rulers of Katanga
Rulers of Kuba
Rulers of Luba
Rulers of Ruund (Luunda)
Rulers of Kasongo Luunda (Yaka)
Rulers of Kongo
Kongo
Rulers of Kongo
Congo, Republic of the (Congo-Brazzaville)
Heads of state of the Republic of the Congo
Heads of government of the Republic of the Congo
Colonial heads of French Equatorial Africa
Equatorial Guinea
Heads of state of Equatorial Guinea
Heads of government of Equatorial Guinea
Colonial heads of Equatorial Guinea (Fernando Poo/Spanish Guinea)
Gabon
Heads of state of Gabon
Heads of government of Gabon
Colonial heads of Gabon
Rulers of Orungu
São Tomé and Príncipe
Heads of state of São Tomé and Príncipe
Heads of government of São Tomé and Príncipe
Presidents of the Regional Government of Príncipe
Colonial Heads of São Tomé and Príncipe

Northern Africa
Algeria
People's Democratic Republic of Algeria
Heads of state of Algeria
Heads of government of Algeria (see also: Prime Ministers of Algeria 
French Algeria (French departements)
French Governors of Algeria
Ottoman regency of Algiers
Ottoman Pashas and Deys of the Regency of Algiers
Tlemcen (Western Algeria) before the Ottomans
Ziyanid dynasty
Western Ifriqiya (Eastern Algeria) before the Ottomans
Hammadid dynasty
Egypt
Rulers of Egypt
Heads of government of Egypt
Colonial heads of Egypt
Pharaohs
Egyptian dynasties
Bahri dynasty of Egypt
Burji dynasty of Egypt
Ayyubid dynasty
Fatimid Caliphs
Monarchs of the Muhammad Ali Dynasty
Libya
Heads of state of Libya
Heads of government of Libya
Colonial heads of Libya
Colonial Heads of Tripolitania
Colonial heads of Cyrenaica
Colonial heads of Fezzan
Governors of Spanish and Hospitaller Tripoli
Rulers of Ottoman Libya
Chiefs of the Senussi order
Cyrene: Kings of Cyrene
Morocco
List of rulers of Morocco
Heads of government of Morocco
French Resident Ministers in Morocco
Spanish High Commissioners in Morocco
Administrators of the Tangier International Zone
Alaouite dynasty
Saadi dynasty
Wattasid dynasty
Marinid dynasty
Almohad dynasty
Almoravid dynasty
Idrisid dynasty
Presidents of Western Sahara
Sudan (formerly Anglo-Egyptian -)
Presidents of Sudan
Prime Ministers of Sudan
Presidents of Southern Sudan
Vice-Presidents of Southern Sudan
Kings of Makuria
Kings of Sennar
Kush
Kushite Kings
List of Egyptian viceroys of Kush
Tunisia
Presidents of Tunisia
Prime Ministers of Tunisia
Beys of Tunis
Hafsid dynasty
Zirid dynasty
Aghlabid dynasty
Carthage: Kings of Carthage

Southern Africa
Botswana 
Heads of state of Botswana
Heads of government of Botswana
List of commissioners of Bechuanaland
Rulers of baKgatla
Rulers of baKwêna
Rulers of Balete (baMalete)
Rulers of baNgwaketse
Rulers of Bangwato (bamaNgwato)
Rulers of baRôlông
Rulers of baTawana
Rulers of baTlôkwa
Lesotho
Kings of Lesotho
Heads of government of Lesotho
Namibia
Presidents of Namibia
Prime Ministers of Namibia
South Africa
List of Bhaca kings
List of Hlubi Kings
List of Mpondo Kings
List of Mpondomise Kings
List of Ndebele Kings
List of Thembu Kings
List of Xhosa Kings & Chiefs
List of Zulu kings
Governors-General of South Africa
State President of South Africa
Prime Ministers of South Africa
Homelands Leaders:
Heads of state of Bophuthatswana
Heads of state of Ciskei
Chief Ministers of Gazankulu
Chief Ministers of KaNgwane
Chief Ministers of KwaNdebele
Chief Ministers of KwaZulu
Chief Ministers of Lebowa
Chief Ministers of QwaQwa
Heads of government of Transkei
Heads of state of Transkei
Heads of state of Venda
President of South Africa
South African Premiers
Swaziland
Kings of Swaziland
Heads of government of Swaziland

Western Africa
Benin (former Dahomey)
Heads of state of Benin
Heads of government of Benin
Colonial heads of Benin (Dahomey and Porto-Novo)
Colonial heads of São João Baptista de Ajudá
Rulers of Hogbonu (Ajashe/Porto-Novo)
Bariba (Borgu) states
Rulers of the Bariba state of Kandi
Rulers of the Bariba state of Kwande
Rulers of the Bariba state of Nikki
Rulers of the Bariba state of Paraku
Berba states
Rulers of the Berba state of Gwande
Ewe states
Rulers of the Ewe state of Agwe
Fon states
Rulers of the Fon state of Alada (Allada)
Rulers of the Fon state of Danhome (Agbome) (Dahomey)
Rulers of the Fon state of Savi Hweda
Gurmanche states
Rulers of the Gurmanche state of Jugu (Sugu)
Mahi states
Rulers of the Mahi state of Fitta
Rulers of the Mahi state of Savalu
Yoruba states
Rulers of the Yoruba state of Dassa
Rulers of the Yoruba state of Icha
Rulers of the Yoruba state of Ketu
Rulers of the Yoruba state of Sabe
Burkina Faso (former Upper Volta)
Heads of state of Burkina Faso
Heads of government of Burkina Faso (see also: Prime Minister of Burkina Faso )
Colonial heads of Burkina Faso (Upper Volta)
List of rulers of Liptako
Mossi States:-
Rulers of the Mossi state of Gurunsi
Rulers of the Mossi state of Gwiriko
Rulers of the Mossi state of Tenkodogo
Rulers of the Mossi state of Wogodogo
Rulers of the Mossi state of Yatenga
Rulers of the Gurma Mossi state of Bilanga
Rulers of the Gurma Mossi state of Bilayanga
Rulers of the Gurma Mossi state of Bongandini
Rulers of the Gurma Mossi state of Con
Rulers of the Gurma Mossi state of Macakoali
Rulers of the Gurma Mossi state of Nungu
Rulers of the Gurma Mossi state of Piela
Cape Verde
Heads of state of Cape Verde
Heads of government of Cape Verde (see also: Prime Minister of Cape Verde )
Colonial heads of Cape Verde
Ivory Coast
Heads of state of Ivory Coast
Heads of government of Ivory Coast
Colonial heads of Ivory Coast
The Gambia
Heads of state of the Gambia (see also Governors-General of the Gambia)
Heads of government of the Gambia
Colonial Heads of the Gambia
Ghana: Rulers of Ghana
Heads of state of Ghana
Emperors of Ghana
Guinea
Heads of state of Guinea
Heads of government of Guinea
Colonial heads of Guinea
Guinea-Bissau
Heads of state of Guinea-Bissau
Heads of government of Guinea-Bissau
Colonial heads of Portuguese Guinea
Colonial heads of Bissau
Colonial heads of Cacheu
Liberia
Presidents of Liberia
Agents and Governors of Liberia
Colonial heads of Maryland
Colonial heads of Mississippi
Colonial Heads of Port Cresson and Bassa Cove
Mali (former French Sudan)
Heads of state of Mali
Heads of government of Mali
Colonial heads of Mali
Emperors of Mali, see Mali Empire
Kings of Mali, see Mansa
Songhai emperors, see Songhai Empire
Mauritania
Heads of state of Mauritania
Heads of government of Mauritania
Colonial heads of Mauritania
Niger
Heads of state of Niger
Heads of government of Niger
Nigeria
Governors-General of Nigeria
Presidents of Nigeria
Heads of State of Biafra
List of Sultans of Sokoto
Senegal
Presidents of Senegal
Sierra Leone
Governors-General of Sierra Leone
Presidents of Sierra Leone
Heads of government of Sierra Leone
Togo
Heads of State of Togo
Heads of government of Togo

Americas

Caribbean
Antigua and Barbuda
Governors-General of Antigua and Barbuda
Prime Ministers of Antigua and Barbuda
Bahamas
Governors-General of the Bahamas
Heads of government of the Bahamas
Colonial heads of the Bahamas
Barbados
Presidents of Barbados
Prime Ministers of Barbados
Cuba
First Secretary of the Communist Party of Cuba (de facto leader)
Presidents of Cuba
Premiers of Cuba
Colonial heads of Cuba
Dominica
Presidents of Dominica
Prime Ministers of Dominica
Dominican Republic
Presidents of the Dominican Republic
Grenada
Governors-General of Grenada
Prime Ministers of Grenada
Colonial heads of Grenada
Colonial heads of the Windward Islands
Haiti
List of colonial governors of Saint-Domingue
Presidents of Haiti
Jamaica
Governors-General of Jamaica
Prime Ministers of Jamaica
Saint Kitts and Nevis
Governors-General of Saint Kitts and Nevis
Prime Ministers of Saint Kitts and Nevis
Saint Lucia
Governors-General of Saint Lucia
Prime Ministers of Saint Lucia
Saint Vincent and the Grenadines
Governors-General of Saint Vincent and the Grenadines
Prime Ministers of Saint Vincent and the Grenadines
Trinidad and Tobago
Presidents of Trinidad and Tobago
Prime Ministers of Trinidad and Tobago

Central America
Belize
Governors-General of Belize
Prime Ministers of Belize
Maya rulers of Caracol, see Caracol
Costa Rica
Presidents of Costa Rica
El Salvador
Presidents of El Salvador
Guatemala
Presidents of Guatemala
Maya rulers of Tikal, see Tikal
Honduras
Presidents of Honduras
Maya kings of Xukpi, see Copán
Nicaragua
Presidents of Nicaragua
Panama
Presidents of Panama

North America
Canada
Office-holders of Canada
Mexico
Presidents of Mexico
Mexican monarchs
Aztec emperors, see Hueyi Tlatoani
Maya rulers of Calakmul, see Calakmul
Maya rulers of Palenque, see Palenque
Maya rulers of Tonina, see Tonina
Toltec rulers
Viceroys of New Spain
United States
Office-holders of the United States

South America
Argentina
Presidents of Argentina
Bolivia
Presidents of Bolivia
Brazil
Brazilian monarchs
Presidents of Brazil
Governors of Distrito Federal
Governors of Minas Gerais
Mayors of Belo Horizonte
Governors of Rio de Janeiro
Mayors of Rio de Janeiro
Governors of São Paulo
Chile
Presidents of Chile
Governors of Cardenal Caro
Mayors of Pichilemu
Kings of Easter Island
Royal Governors of Chile
Colombia
Presidents of Colombia
List of Governors of the Department of Quindío
Ecuador
Presidents of Ecuador
Heads of State of Ecuador
Guyana
Governors-General of Guyana
Presidents of Guyana
Prime Ministers of Guyana
Paraguay
Presidents of Paraguay
Peru
Presidents of Peru
Incan emperors, see Inca Empire
Viceroys of Peru
Suriname
Presidents of Suriname
Uruguay
Presidents of Uruguay
Venezuela
Presidents of Venezuela

Asia

Central Asia
Kazakhstan
Göktürk kagans
Presidents of Kazakhstan
Kyrgyzstan
Khans of Kara-Khitai, see Kara-Khitan Khanate
Presidents of Kyrgyzstan
Tajikistan
Presidents of Tajikistan
Turkmenistan
Presidents of Turkmenistan
Uzbekistan
Presidents of Uzbekistan

Eastern Asia
China & dependencies
Chinese sovereigns
Table of Chinese monarchs
People's Republic of China
General Secretary of the Chinese Communist Party (paramount leader)
President of the People's Republic of China
Premier of the State Council of the People's Republic of China
Chairman of the Standing Committee of the National People's Congress
Chairman of the National Committee of the Chinese People's Political Consultative Conference
Politburo Standing Committee of the Chinese Communist Party
Hong Kong
Governor of Hong Kong (under British rule, now replaced by Chief Executive)
Chief Executive of Hong Kong
Macau
Governor of Macau (under Portuguese rule, now replaced by Chief Executive)
Chief Executive of Macau
Republic of China (Taiwan)
President of the Republic of China
Premier of the Republic of China
Governors and Chairpersons of Taiwan, see Taiwan Province
Tibet
List of imperial ambans in Tibet
The Table of Chinese monarchs China
List of kings of Tibet China
Japan
Rulers of Japan (Emperors, Regents, Shōguns and Prime Ministers)
Emperors of Japan
Prime Ministers of Japan
Ashikaga shogunate
Kamakura shogunate
Tokugawa shogunate
Mongolia
Grand Khan of Mongolia
Presidents of Mongolia
Prime Minister of Mongolia
Korea
Rulers of Korea
North Korea
First Secretary of the Workers' Party of Korea (supreme leader)
Heads of state of North Korea
Premiers of North Korea
South Korea
Presidents of South Korea
Prime Ministers of South Korea
Rulers of Korea

Southeastern Asia
Brunei
Sultans of Brunei
Cambodia
King of Cambodia
Khmer emperors, see Khmer Empire
Presidents of Cambodia
Prime Ministers of Cambodia
East Timor
Presidents of East Timor
Prime Ministers of East Timor
Indonesia
Majapahit
Sailendra
Srivijaya
Kings of Mataram, see Kingdom of Mataram
Presidents of Indonesia
Prime Ministers of Indonesia
Laos
Kings of Laos
General Secretary of the Lao People's Revolutionary Party (de facto leader)
Presidents of Laos
Prime Ministers of Laos
Malaysia
Yang di-Pertuan Agong
Prime Ministers of Malaysia
Sultans of Malay states, example see Sultanate of Malacca
Myanmar
Kings of Myanmar
Presidents of Myanmar
Prime Ministers of Myanmar
State Counsellor of Myanmar
Philippines
Spanish Royal Governor of the Philippines
American Governor-General of the Philippines
Presidents of the Philippines
Datus, Rajas, and Sultans of various historical polities within the Philippine Islands, see History of the Philippines
Sultans of the Sulu Sultanate
List of sovereign state leaders in the Philippines 
Singapore
President of Singapore
Prime Minister of Singapore
Thailand
Kings of Thailand
Chakri dynasty
Kings of Ayutthaya, see Ayutthaya kingdom
Kings of Haripunchai, see Haripunchai
Kings of Lanna, see Lanna
Kings of Sukhothai, see Sukhothai kingdom
Prime Ministers of Thailand
Presidents of the National Assembly of Thailand
Leaders of the Opposition of Thailand
Governors of Bangkok
Vietnam
Vietnamese dynasties
Kings of Vietnam
General Secretary of the Communist Party of Vietnam (de facto leader)
President of Vietnam
Prime Minister of Vietnam
Chairman of National Assembly of Vietnam
Chief Justice of Vietnam

South Asia
Afghanistan
Afghan Transitional Administration personnel
Leaders of Afghanistan
Prime ministers of Afghanistan
Rulers of Kabul
Rulers of Herat
Rulers of Kandahar
Rulers of Peshawar
Rulers of Ghazni
Ghaznavid emperors, see Ghaznavid Empire
Kabul Shahi dynasty
 Turk Shahi dynasty
 Hindu Shahi dynasty
Bangladesh
Presidents of Bangladesh
Prime Ministers of Bangladesh
Bhutan
Kings of Bhutan
Prime Ministers of Bhutan
India

List of Indian monarchs
List of presidents of India
List of prime ministers of India
Governors, Lieutenant Governors and Administrators of Indian States and Union Territories
Chief Ministers of Indian States
Maldives
Sultans of the Maldives
Presidents of the Maldives
Nepal
List of monarchs of Nepal
Prime Ministers of Nepal
Pakistan
Presidents of Pakistan
Prime Ministers of Pakistan
Sri Lanka
Presidents of Sri Lanka
Prime Ministers of Sri Lanka

Western Asia
Armenia
Kings of Urartu
List of Armenian Kings
Kings of Kommagene
Shaddadid dynasty
President of Armenia
Prime Minister of Armenia
Azerbaijan
Arsacid dynasty of Caucasian Albania
Mihranids
Presidents of Azerbaijan
Prime Ministers of Azerbaijan
Presidents of the Nagorno-Karabakh Republic
Bahrain
Monarchs of Bahrain
Cyprus
Kings of Cyprus
Officers of the Kingdom of Cyprus
Presidents of Cyprus
Presidents of Northern Cyprus
Prime Ministers of Northern Cyprus
Georgia
Lists of Georgian monarchs
Colchis
Kingdom of Abkhazia
Divan of the Abkhazian Kings
List of sovereigns of Kakheti
Kingdom of Imereti
 Gurieli
Emirs of Tbilisi
List of leaders of Georgia
Prime Minister of Georgia
Chairman of the Government of Adjara
Presidents of Abkhazia
Prime Ministers of Abkhazia
Presidents of South Ossetia
Prime Ministers of South Ossetia
Iran
List of heads of state of Iran
List of monarchs of Persia
Supreme Leader of Iran
List of presidents of Iran
List of premiers of Iran
List of prime ministers of Iran
Iraq
Sumer
List of Mesopotamian dynasties
Akkad
Kings of Akkad
Gutian kings
Kings of Assyria
Kings of Babylon
Rulers of Adiabene
Abbasid Caliphs
Annazid dynasty
Kings of Iraq
Presidents of Iraq
Prime Ministers of Iraq
Civilian Administrator of Iraq
Israel
Prime Minister of Israel
President of Israel
Rulers of Israel and Judah
Kings of Israel
Kings of Judah
High Priests of Israel
Crusader States
Kings of Jerusalem
Vassals of the Kingdom of Jerusalem
Princes of Galilee
Lords of Toron
Counts of Jaffa and Ascalon
Lords of Ramla
Lords of Ibelin
Lords of Oultrejordain
Lords of Sidon
Officers of the Kingdom of Jerusalem
Presidents of the Palestinian National Authority
Prime Ministers of the Palestinian National Authority
Jordan (formerly Transjordan)
Kings of Jordan
Rulers of Nabatea
Kuwait
Emirs of Kuwait
Al-Sabah
Lebanon
Presidents of Lebanon
Prime Ministers of Lebanon
Speakers of the Parliament of Lebanon
Oman (formerly Muscat (and Oman))
Sultans of Oman
Qatar
Emirs of Qatar
Saudi Arabia
Sharif of Mecca
Kings of Saudi Arabia
Syria
Presidents of Syria
Prime Ministers of Syria
Kings of Syria
Osroene
Rulers of Damascus
Zengid dynasty
Counts of Edessa
Princes of Antioch
Officers of the Principality of Antioch
Emirs of Shaizar
Ghassanid kings
Rulers of Aleppo
Hanilgalbat: Kings of Hanilgabat, see Hanilgalbat and Mitanni
Kings of Ugarit
Turkey
List of Hittite kings
Kings of Arzawa
Kings of Lydia
Kings of Bithynia
Kings of Cappadocia
Attalid Kings of Pergamon
Kings of Pontus
Pharnacid Dynasty
Kings of Galatia
Byzantine Emperors
Tetrarchy
List of Latin Emperors
Empire of Trebizond
Seljuk sultans of Rüm
Anatolian beyliks
List of Sultans of the Ottoman Empire
Prime Ministers of Turkey
Presidents of Turkey
United Arab Emirates
Prime Ministers of the United Arab Emirates
Presidents of the United Arab Emirates
Yemen
Presidents of Yemen
Prime Ministers of Yemen
Presidents of North Yemen
Prime Ministers of North Yemen
Presidents of South Yemen
Prime Ministers of South Yemen

Europe

Eastern Europe
Belarus
Moldova
Presidents of Moldova
Prime Ministers of Moldova
Governors of Gagauzia
Presidents of Transnistria
Prime Ministers of Transnistria
Romania
Dacian kings
Rulers of Wallachia
Rulers of Moldavia
Rulers of Transylvania
List of heads of state of Romania
Prime Ministers of Romania
Russia and the Soviet Union
List of leaders of Russia
List of Russian monarchs 
Leaders of the Soviet Union
President of the Soviet Union
Premier of the Soviet Union
Presidents of Russia
Prime Ministers of Russia
Khans of the Golden Horde
List of Kazan khans
List of Khazar rulers
Rulers of Kievan Rus'
Grand Prince of Tver
Ukraine
Rulers of Kievan Rus'
List of rulers of Halych and Volhynia
Hetmans of Ukrainian Cossacks
List of Crimean khans
Presidents of Ukraine
Prime Ministers of Ukraine

Northern Europe
Denmark
Danish monarchs
Prime Ministers of Denmark
List of legendary kings of Denmark
Faroe Islands
Faroese monarchs
Prime Ministers of the Faroe Islands
Governor of the Faroe Islands
Greenland
Prime Ministers of Greenland
Governors of Greenland
Inspectors of Greenland
Estonia
Estonian rulers
Heads of government of Estonia
Presidents of Estonia
State Elders of Estonia
Finland
Prime Ministers of Finland
Presidents of Finland
Finnish rulers
Provincial Governors of Finland
Premiers of Åland
Iceland
Presidents of Iceland
Prime Ministers of Iceland
Icelandic rulers
List of lawspeakers, see Lawspeaker
Ireland: Rulers of Ireland
Latvia
Presidents of Latvia
Prime Ministers of Latvia
Lithuania
List of Lithuanian rulers
Presidents of Lithuania
Prime Ministers of Lithuania
Norway
Norwegian monarchs
Line of succession to the Norwegian Throne
Legendary kings of Norway
Norwegian Prime Ministers
Sweden
Swedish monarchs
Prime Ministers of Sweden
Swedish Field Marshals
County Governors of Sweden
Swedish semi-legendary kings
Mythological kings of Sweden
Kings of Geatland

Blekinge Governors
Dalarna Governors
Gävleborg Governors
Gotland Governors
Halland Governors
Jämtland Governors
Jönköping Governors
Kalmar Governors
Kronoberg Governors
Norrbotten Governors
Skåne Governors
Stockholm Governors
Södermanland Governors
Uppsala Governors
Värmland Governors
Västerbotten Governors
Västernorrland Governors
Västmanland Governors
Västra Götaland Governors
Örebro Governors
Östergötland Governors

United Kingdom: List of rulers of the United Kingdom and predecessor states

Central Europe
Austria
Rulers of Austria
Emperors of Austria
Foreign Ministers of Austria-Hungary
Ministers-President of Austria
Federal Presidents of Austria
Chancellors of Austria (Vice Chancellors of Austria)
Habsburg
Babenberg
Margraves, dukes, and archdukes of Austria
Dukes of Styria, see Styria (duchy)
Dukes of Carinthia, see Carinthia (duchy)
Czech Republic
Rulers of Bohemia (Czech lands)
List of presidents of Czechoslovakia
List of prime ministers of Czechoslovakia
 List of rulers of the Protectorate Bohemia and Moravia
Presidents of the Czech Republic
Prime Ministers of the Czech Republic
Germany: Rulers of Germany
Hungary
List of Hungarian rulers
List of heads of state of Hungary
Prime Ministers of Hungary
Liechtenstein
Princes of Liechtenstein
Liechtenstein Heads of Government
Poland
Polish rulers
Dukes of Silesia
Dukes of Mazovia
Dukes of Greater Poland
Dukes of Łęczyca
Dukes of Sieradz
Duchy of Cieszyn
Dukes of Pomerania
List of prime ministers of Poland
List of Polish presidents
Slovakia
Presidents of Slovakia
Prime Ministers of Slovakia
Parliament leaders of Slovakia
Switzerland
Members of the Swiss Federal Council
Presidents of the Confederation
Heads of the Department of Defence, Civil Protection and Sports, see Military of Switzerland
Heads of the Department of Foreign Affairs: see International relations of Switzerland
Heads of the Department of Home Affairs
Heads of the Federal Department of Finance
Heads of the Federal Department of Environment, Transport, Energy and Communications
Heads of the Federal Department of Economic Affairs
Heads of the Federal Department of Justice and Police
Federal Chancellors of Switzerland
Presidents of the Swiss National Council
Presidents of the Swiss Council of States
Members of the Swiss National Council
Members of the Swiss Council of States
Chief Justices of the Swiss Supreme Court
Presidents of the Swiss Diet (before 1848)

Southern Europe
Albania
List of rulers of Illyria
Monarchs of Albania
Prime Ministers of Albania
Presidents of Albania
Andorra
Co-Princes of Andorra
Bishop of Urgell
Prime Ministers of Andorra
Bosnia and Herzegovina
List of rulers of Bosnia
Members of the Presidency of Bosnia and Herzegovina
Prime Ministers of Bosnia and Herzegovina
Bulgaria
Thracian kings
Kings of Odrysia
Moesia: Roman governors of Lower Moesia
Bulgarian monarchs
Prime Ministers of Bulgaria
Presidents of Bulgaria
Croatia
List of rulers of Croatia
Presidents of Croatia
Prime Ministers of Croatia
Governors and Heads of State of Fiume
Heads of state of Krajina
Heads of government of Krajina
Greece: Rulers of Greece
Italy: Rulers of Italy
Kosovo
Presidents of Kosovo
Prime Minister of Kosovo
North Macedonia
Presidents of North Macedonia
Prime Ministers of North Macedonia
Malta
Presidents of Malta, 1974–present
Prime Ministers of Malta, 1921–1933, 1947–1958, 1962–present
Monarchs of Malta, 1091–1798, 1800–1974
Grand Masters of Malta, 1530–1798
Civil Commissioners of Malta, 1799–1813
Governors of Malta, 1813–1964
Governors-General of Malta, 1964–1974
Montenegro
Rulers of Montenegro
List of presidents of Montenegro
Prime Minister of Montenegro
Portugal
Portuguese monarchs
Dukes of Braganza
Princes of Beira
Prime Ministers of Portugal
Presidents of Portugal
List of Portuguese monarchs
San Marino
Captains Regent of San Marino, 1900–present
Captains Regent of San Marino, 1700–1900
Captains Regent of San Marino, 1500–1700
Captains Regent of San Marino, 1243–1500
Serbia
Presidents of Serbia
Prime Ministers of Serbia
President of the Government of Vojvodina
List of heads of state of Yugoslavia
Prime Minister of Yugoslavia
President of Serbia and Montenegro
Prime Minister of Serbia and Montenegro
Monarchs of Serbia
Princes of Zeta
Slovenia
Presidents of Slovenia
Prime Minister of Slovenia
Spain
Rulers of Spain
Presidents of Spain
Prime Ministers of Spain
Vatican City
Popes
Cardinal Secretary of State

Western Europe
Belgium
Belgian monarchs
Prime Ministers of Belgium
Governors of the Habsburg Netherlands
Minister-President of the Brussels-Capital Region
List of Ministers-President of the Flemish Community
List of Ministers-President of the Walloon Region
List of Ministers-President of the French Community
List of Ministers-President of the German-speaking Community
France: Rulers of France
Luxembourg
Prime Ministers of Luxembourg
Grand Duke of Luxembourg
List of Counts and Dukes of Luxembourg
Monaco
Princes of Monaco
Succession to the Monegasque Throne
Ministers of State
Prime Ministers of Monaco
Netherlands
Dutch monarchy
Prime Ministers of the Netherlands
List of rulers of the Netherlands
Governors of the Habsburg Netherlands
Low Countries (Netherlands, Belgium):
Rulers of East Frisia
Rulers of Frisia
Prince of Orange
Duke of Brabant
Lords and margraves of Bergen op Zoom
Dukes and counts of Guelders
Duke of Lower Lorraine
Count of Bouillon
Count of Flanders
Count of Hainaut
Count of Holland
Counts of Leuven
Bishop of Utrecht
Marquis of Namur

Oceania

Australasia
Australia
Monarchs of Australia
Governors-General of Australia
Cabinet of Australia
Prime Ministers of Australia
Deputy Prime Ministers of Australia
Attorneys General for Australia
Ministers for Defence
Ministers for Foreign Affairs
Treasurers of Australia

Premiers of New South Wales
Premiers of Queensland
Premiers of South Australia
Premiers of Tasmania
Premiers of Victoria
Premier of Western Australia
Heads of government of Norfolk Island
Chief Minister of the Northern Territory
Chief Minister of the Australian Capital Territory
Governors of New South Wales
Governors of Queensland
Governors of South Australia
Governors of Tasmania
Governors of Victoria
Governor of Western Australia
Administrative Heads of Norfolk Island
Administrator of the Northern Territory
Administrative Heads of Jervis Bay
Administrative Heads of Australian Antarctic Territory
Administrative Heads of Macquarie Island

Cocos Islands
King of the Cocos Islands
New Zealand
Governors-General of New Zealand
New Zealand Cabinet
Prime Ministers of New Zealand
Deputy Prime Ministers of New Zealand
Ministers of Finance
Ministers of Foreign Affairs
Speakers of the House of Representatives
Māori Kings and Queens
Mayors of Auckland
Mayors of Christchurch
Mayors of Dunedin
Mayors of Wellington

Melanesia
Fiji
Chairmen of Fiji's Great Council of Chiefs
Chief Justice of Fiji
Colonial Governors of Fiji
Fijian Heads of State
Foreign Ministers of Fiji
Governors-General of Fiji
House of Representatives of Fiji (abolished in 2013)
Ministers for Fijian Affairs
Presidents of Fiji
Prime Ministers of Fiji
Senate of Fiji (abolished in 2013)
Speakers of the Fijian House of Representatives
Vice-Presidents of Fiji
Papua New Guinea
Governor-General of Papua New Guinea
Prime Ministers of Papua New Guinea
Solomon Islands
Governor-General of Solomon Islands
Prime Minister of the Solomon Islands
Vanuatu
President of Vanuatu
Prime Minister of Vanuatu

Micronesia
Kiribati
President of Kiribati
Marshall Islands
Presidents of the Marshall Islands
Federated States of Micronesia
President of the Federated States of Micronesia
Nauru
President of Nauru
Palau
President of Palau

Polynesia
Cook Islands
Prime Ministers of the Cook Islands
Niue
Premiers of Niue
Samoa
Samoan Heads of State
Malietoa
Members of the Council of Deputies of Samoa
Prime Ministers of Samoa
Chief Justice of Samoa
Finance Ministers of Samoa
Foreign Affairs Ministers of Samoa
Health Ministers of Samoa
Education Ministers of Samoa
Public Works Ministers of Samoa
Fono Aoao Faitulafono o Samoa - current membership (2006)
Tonga
Kings of Tonga
Prime Ministers of Tonga
Tuvalu
Governor-Generals of Tuvalu
Prime Ministers of Tuvalu

Religious leaders

Christian
List of current Christian leaders
List of Patriarchs, Archbishops and Bishops

Catholic Church
List of popes
Grand Masters of the Knights Hospitaller
Priors of St John of Jerusalem in England

Anglican Communion
List of Archbishops of Canterbury
Anglican Primates

Other denominations
General of The Salvation Army
Moderator of the United Church of Canada
President of The Church of Jesus Christ of Latter-day Saints 
Patriarchs of Constantinople

Judaism
Chief Rabbis of the United Kingdom
Chief Rabbis of Israel

Islam
Caliphate
Shi'a Imam

Hinduism
Rashtriya Swayamsevak Sangh
Arya Samaja

Buddhist
Dalai Lama
Panchen Lama
Karmapa
Shamarpa
Sakya Trizin
Supreme Patriarch of Thailand
Supreme Patriarch of Cambodia

Other lists 
 List of oldest living state leaders
 List of current governments
 List of current vice presidents and designated acting presidents
 List of current presidents of legislatures

Ministers by portfolio
Defence minister
Finance minister
Foreign minister
Interior minister
Justice minister

Municipal leaders

External links
Current Heads of State
Archontology, by Oleg Schultz
Rulers, by B. Schemmel - detailed lists (including regional and religious leaders) from 1700.
World Statesmen, by Ben Cahoon
World Political Leaders, by Roberto Ortiz de Zárate